The anterior superior alveolar arteries originate from the infraorbital artery; they supply the upper incisors and canines; they also supply the mucous membrane of the maxillary sinus.

See also
 Anterior superior alveolar nerve
 Posterior superior alveolar artery

Arteries of the head and neck